Cymbodinium elegans is a species of marine dinoflagellates in the order Noctilucales. It is the only species in its genus.

References

External links 
 
 Cymbodinium elegans at AlgaeBase

Dinophyceae
Species described in 1967